Koruj (also Romanized as Korūj; also known as Kūroch) is a village in Golestan Rural District, in the Central District of Falavarjan County, Isfahan Province, Iran. At the 2006 census, its population was 1,654, in 447 families.

References 

Populated places in Falavarjan County